Francisco Xabier Azkargorta Uriarte (born 26 September 1953) is a Spanish retired footballer who played as a forward, and is a manager.

Football career
Born in Azpeitia, Gipuzkoa, Azkargorta spent five years under contract to Athletic Bilbao after arriving in 1971 from neighbouring Real Sociedad and completed his development at the former, but failed to appear in any official games with the first team due to injury. He retired at only 23 years of age.

Azkargorta started working as a manager one year after retiring, his beginnings being in lower league football mainly in his native Basque Country. In the summer of 1982, the 28-year-old was appointed at Gimnàstic de Tarragona in Segunda División B and, the following season, moved straight into La Liga after signing for RCD Español.

After two more years in Catalonia, Azkargorta continued to coach in the top flight until 1991, being in charge of Real Valladolid, Sevilla FC and CD Tenerife. He was dismissed by the last two clubs before the respective campaigns ended.

Still in the decade, Azkargorta worked with the national teams of Bolivia and Chile. He led the former to the 1994 FIFA World Cup, thus marking the first time the country reached the tournament through the qualification process. In 1997, he returned to club duties after signing with Yokohama F. Marinos, and eight years later he took charge of Mexico's C.D. Guadalajara. In between, he spent two years with Real Madrid as head of its academies in Central and South America.

In March 2006, Azkargorta was appointed director of football at Beijing Guoan F.C. in the Chinese Super League. In the 2008 summer he returned to his homeland, joining Valencia CF in the same capacity.

Azkargorta was again chosen as Bolivian national side manager on 17 July 2012, replacing Gustavo Quinteros six games into the 2014 World Cup qualifying campaign. He was relieved of his duties on 9 March 2014, after it was revealed he had signed with Club Bolívar.

Personal life
Azkargorta's younger brother, Juan Ignacio, was also a footballer.

Managerial statistics

References

External links

1953 births
Living people
People from Azpeitia
Spanish footballers
Footballers from the Basque Country (autonomous community)
Association football forwards
Athletic Bilbao footballers
Bilbao Athletic footballers
Spanish football managers
La Liga managers
Segunda División B managers
Tercera División managers
Gimnàstic de Tarragona managers
RCD Espanyol managers
Real Valladolid managers
Sevilla FC managers
CD Tenerife managers
J1 League managers
Yokohama F. Marinos managers
Liga MX managers
C.D. Guadalajara managers
Club Bolívar managers
Oriente Petrolero managers
C.D. Palmaflor del Trópico managers
Bolivia national football team managers
Chile national football team managers
1993 Copa América managers
1994 FIFA World Cup managers
1995 Copa América managers
Spanish expatriate football managers
Expatriate football managers in Bolivia
Expatriate football managers in Chile
Expatriate football managers in Japan
Expatriate football managers in Mexico
Spanish expatriate sportspeople in Bolivia
Spanish expatriate sportspeople in Chile
Spanish expatriate sportspeople in Japan
Spanish expatriate sportspeople in Mexico
Spanish expatriate sportspeople in China